The 1970–71 Liga Alef season saw Maccabi Jaffa (champions of the North Division) and Hapoel Be'er Sheva (champions of the South Division) win the title and promotion to Liga Leumit.

North Division

South Division

References
Yesterday at Liga Alef Maariv, 13.6.71, Historical Jewish Press 
Previous seasons The Israel Football Association 

Liga Alef seasons
Israel
2